Gastrolobium trilobum, commonly known as bullock poison, is a flowering plant in the  family Fabaceae, and is endemic to Western Australia. It is a small, rigid shrub with orange, yellow and red flowers.

Description
Gastrolobium trilobum is a spindly, spreading, prostrate shrub with needle-shaped hairy stems, some sections partly spiky. Flowering occurs from July to November and the fruit is a pod or a follicle.

Taxonomy and naming
Gastrolobium trilobum was first formally described in 1839 by John Lindley from an unpublished description by George Bentham. Lindley's description was published in A Sketch of the Vegetation of the Swan River Colony. The specific epithet (trilobum) means "lobed".

Distribution
Bullock poison grows in the Avon Wheatbelt, Jarrah Forest and mallee.

References

trilobum
Plants described in 1839
Rosids of Western Australia
Endemic flora of Australia
Taxa named by John Lindley